Higher Than Here is the fourth studio album by English singer-songwriter James Morrison. It was released on 30 October 2015 by Island Records.

Critical reception

AllMusic editor Neil Z. Yeung rated the album three out of five stars. He called Higher Than Here "a comforting collection of soul-folk tunes that is pleasing and enjoyable. Much like Morrison himself, the songs are likable. His voice still carries that gorgeous, husky grit, so full of smoky soul and yearning, most expertly executed on "Stay Like This" and "Just Like a Child." Elsewhere, he ventures into some OneRepublic/Script territory with the catchy hip-pop lead single "Demons"."

Track listing

Charts

Certifications

References

External links
  
 

2015 albums
James Morrison (singer) albums
Island Records albums
Albums produced by Mark Taylor (music producer)